Archbishop Kyrill (secular name Boris Mikhailovich Dmitriyev or Dmitrieff, ; born 24 November 1954), is the ruling bishop of the Western American Diocese of the Russian Orthodox Church Outside Russia (ROCOR).

Biography 
He was born on November 24, 1954 in San Francisco, California to ethnic Russian immigrant parents. At the age of 18, he was tonsured reader by Archbishop Anthony (Medvedev). In 1976 he graduated from University with a degree in theology. He then attended Saint Vladimir's Seminary, where he received his master's degree.

In 1981 he was tonsured a monk and ordained a hierodeacon and then a hieromonk by Metropolitan Philaret (Voznesensky).  The same year he was appointed to the Russian Ecclesiastic Mission in Jerusalem as a teacher of Russian and English at the Bethany School. In 1982 he was transferred to the Western American diocese.

In 1987, he was appointed rector of the Ss Cyrill and Methodius Russian Church school at the Joy of all Who Sorrow Cathedral in San Francisco and was elevated to the rank of hegumen.

June 7, 1992 he was consecrated bishop of Seattle, Vicar of the Western American Diocese.

After the repose of Archbishop Anthony in 2000, he was appointed ruling hierarch of the Western American Diocese.

In December 2003 he was elevated to the rank of archbishop.

In May 2004 he participated in the first official delegation of the Russian Orthodox Church Outside Russia to Russia, which opened the process of reconciliation with the Moscow Patriarchate.

On May 19, 2006, by the decision of the Council of Bishops of the Russian Orthodox Church Outside Russia, in connection with the retirement of Bishop Ambrose (Cantacuzène), he was appointed a member of the Commission for Negotiations with the Moscow Patriarchate.

Honours
  House of Romanov: Knight Grand Cordon of the Imperial Order of Saint Anna (14 May 2013)
  House of Romanov: Recipient of the 400th Anniversary Medal of the House of Romanov (14 May 2013)

References

External links
 Official website of the Diocese of San Francisco and Western America  
 Epistle of His Grace Archbishop Kyrill

21st-century Eastern Orthodox archbishops
American people of Russian descent
1954 births
Living people
Eastern Orthodox bishops in the United States
Recipients of the Order of St. Anna, 1st class
Russian Orthodox Christians from the United States